The following is a list of the 309 communes of the Nièvre department of France.

The communes cooperate in the following intercommunalities (as of 2020):
Communauté d'agglomération Moulins Communauté (partly)
Communauté d'agglomération de Nevers
Communauté de communes Amognes Cœur du Nivernais
Communauté de communes Bazois Loire Morvan
Communauté de communes Les Bertranges (partly)
Communauté de communes Cœur de Loire
Communauté de communes Haut Nivernais-Val d'Yonne (partly)
Communauté de communes Loire et Allier
Communauté de communes Morvan Sommets et Grands Lacs
Communauté de communes du Nivernais Bourbonnais
Communauté de communes de Puisaye-Forterre (partly)
Communauté de communes Sud Nivernais
Communauté de communes Tannay-Brinon-Corbigny

References

Nievre